The Forthing S500 is a compact MPV produced by Dongfeng Liuzhou Motor under the Forthing (Dongfeng Fengxing) sub-brand.

Overview

The Fengxing S500 officially debuted in April 2015 at the 2015 Shanghai Auto Show. 

The S500 is a seven-seater in a 2-2-3 seating configuration with prices ranging from 65,000 yuan to 99,900 yuan. The Fengxing S500 is powered by an inline-4 1.5 liter and 1.6 liter petrol engines, mated to a five-speed manual transmission or a CVT.

References

External links
Official website

Compact MPVs
2010s cars
Fengxing S500
Cars introduced in 2015
Front-wheel-drive vehicles
Cars of China